Daedalochila hippocrepis is a species of air-breathing land snail, a terrestrial pulmonate gastropod mollusk in the family  Polygyridae.

This species is endemic to the state of Texas in the United States.

References

 Mollusc Specialist Group 1996.  Polygyra hippocrepis.   2006 IUCN Red List of Threatened Species.   Downloaded on 7 August 2007.

Polygyridae
Molluscs of the United States